The Pendleton Correctional Facility, formerly known as the Indiana Reformatory, is a state prison located in Fall Creek Township, Madison County, near Pendleton and about  northeast of Indianapolis. Established in 1923, it was built to replace the Indiana State Reformatory located in Jeffersonville after a fire severely damaged the original property. The Pendleton facility currently offers maximum and minimum-security housing for adult males over 22 years old. The maximum-security portion is made up of  surrounded by a concrete wall. It has an average daily population of approximately 1,650 inmates.    Located on the grounds outside the enclosure, the minimum-security dormitory holds approximately 200 prisoners on a daily basis.

History

Indiana's first state prison was opened on January 9, 1821, in Jeffersonville.  The prison, later called Indiana State Prison South, accepted inmates regardless of age, sex, offense, or sentence.  In 1847, the prison buildings were in poor repair and the decision was made that it would be built a new in nearby Clarksville.   Another prison opened in the northern part of the state in Michigan City, Indiana and the inmates were divided between the two.  In 1897, due to the belief that young male offenders should not be housed with their older counterparts, inmates were divided by age between the South and North. The Indiana State Prison South became home to inmates age 16 to 30 and the prison was renamed the Indiana Reformatory.

During the night of February 6, 1918, a fire severely damaged the majority of the buildings at Clarksville. The Governor's Commission decided to build a new prison in a more centrally located site.  A plot of land south of the city of Pendleton was selected because Fall Creek provided a source of running water.  The construction commenced at the new locale during March 1922.

Herbert W. Folz was the architect in charge of designing the new prison.  The facility is an "example of a 'radial plan' prison, in which the cell blocks fan out from a central point."  According to a report on the Reformatory, Folz "made a conscious effort to arrange the buildings within the enclosure in such a manner that a maximum of light and air and green grass would be in evidence."  The buildings were modeled after the Spanish Colonial Revival style.  The original facilities included three cell houses, a dormitory, and the administration building.

Construction on the prison continued until March 1924 when A. F. Miles, the General Superintendent, ended the contracts with the architect and other contractors.  He proposed completing construction on the prison using inmates as the laborers.  Miles organized the prisoners into groups, with each group concentrating on a specific aspect of the work.  Each of these specialty groups was assigned to a professional in the field who would provide them guidance in learning the craft.  Some of the tasks inmates participated in included bricklaying, plumbing, roofing, electrical work, and painting.  By switching from free labor to inmate labor, Miles decreased the labor costs from $61,000 to $4,500 in a short amount of time.  While inmate labor was an effective cost-cutting tool, it also gave the men an opportunity to learn a "useful trade." Miles continued his cost-cutting ways by purchasing materials at a lower price than the plan had originally allotted.

In June 1996, the Indiana General Assembly passed House Enrolled Act 1229 which changed the name of the Indiana Reformatory.  Put into effect on July 1, 1996, the Indiana Reformatory was officially named the Pendleton Correctional Facility.

In 2017, American filmmaker Madeleine Sackler created two films filmed entirely in Pendleton Correctional Facility. One is fictional drama titled O.G. and the second is a cinéma vérité-style documentary called It's a Hard Truth, Ain't It. This is the first time that a fiction and non-fiction film have been filmed entirely inside a Level 4 prison.

Major Incidents

Riot
On February 1, 1985, a riot took place at the Pendleton Correctional Facility, then still known as the Indiana Reformatory. An inmate, Lincoln Love #5268 (still incarcerated), was badly beaten by correctional officers after he refused to vacate his cell during a weapons check, also called a shakedown. Tear gas was used in large quantities in the cellblock, although eyewash was only offered to the officers. Inmates John Cole and Christopher Trotter rushed to the maximum restraint unit where the beating had taken place. The two proceeded to the infirmary where Love was located and attacked the officers in that area. They held staff hostage when they took over the J-Cellhouse. After the riot was over, inmates had stabbed seven correctional officers and held three employees hostage for 17 hours.

1988–2011
In 1988, the superintendent of the Indiana Reformatory, Edward L. Cohn, was reprimanded for shackling inmates in manners that violated current prison standards. Inmates were shackled in a position that allowed them neither to stand up nor lay straight.  This position is achieved by placing handcuffs around an inmates wrists and connecting them to leg irons with a short chain. One prisoner was kept in a maximum-restraint unit in this position for seven days, not even being allowed to loosen his shackles to eat or to use the bathroom. On another occasion, seven inmates wearing only underwear were placed in a single room. After two of the inmates were removed, the remaining five were put in restraints consistent with those mentioned in the previous incidents for one day. These were not the only cases of illegal restraints being used on prisoners. As a result of these incidents, Superintendent Cohn was placed on paid leave for approximately three months. Cohn lost "30 days worth of pay and a merit raise." His two assistants were suspended for a number days without pay, denied their merit raises, and required to undergo performance evaluations quarterly instead of annually. In later years Edward L. Cohn went on to become the Commissioner of the Indiana Department of Correction.

In 1990, Pendleton came under fire for allowing an unsafe environment for inmates after two prisoners were fatally stabbed within a two-week period. Jesus Rodriquez #856496 was killed while he was in the segregation unit and Samuel Miller #906085 was murdered the day after he was released from the same unit.

Two separate incidents involving sexual misconduct between employees and inmates brought to light in 2001. The first occurred on December 8 of the previous year. An inmate and a female nurse were caught on camera engaging in a sexual act in a closet. The cameras were in place to record possible tobacco trafficking believed to have been occurring in the closet. Clips of the tape from the camera were shown often on the news during the scandal. In the second case, a female guard accused an inmate of inappropriately touching her. It was later revealed that she had consensual sex with an inmate in a hallway.

On May 1, 2004, an unidentified caller phoned the Pendleton Correctional Facility about plans of assaults and escape attempts by the inmates. The phone call occurred at a time during which prisoners had set up an eight-step action plan. This plan asked inmates to "boycott recreation periods on some days, submit grievances about food portions, visitation privileges, and law library access, and pick days when everyone in a cell house would show up for breakfast, which is optional." The phone call, in addition to increasing inmate on inmate violence, prompted the then-Superintendent Zettie Cotton to impose a lockdown on the prison. During the lockdown, brown bag lunches were served, classes were not allowed to meet, and visiting hours were cut down. The lockdown lasted a total of five months, one of the longest in recent years of any prison in Indiana.

On October 9, 2008, at 12:39 a.m. during a routine security check, convicted killer was found hanging in his cell. Attempts to resuscitate him were unsuccessful and he was pronounced dead at 1:20 a.m. Rios was convicted in October 2007 for the murder of his three children and his wife in Fort Wayne, Indiana in December 2005. He also was convicted of raping and killing 10-year-old Alejandra Gutierrez. Rios was serving a total of 5 life-terms plus 50 years for the rape and molestation of Alejandra Gutierrez.

On January 25, 2010 52-year-old offender was stabbed by another inmate shortly before 1:30 Saturday as offenders were being released to go to recreation. Jackson, who previously lived in Marion, was transported to the facility's emergency room, where he was pronounced dead about 45 minutes later. Jackson had been sentenced to 80 years for rape in Grant County.

On May 28, 2011, was stabbed around 1:45 p.m. Saturday in a segregation unit. Officers rushed the victim to the in-house health care center where less than an hour later he was pronounced dead. Knapp had been serving a three-year sentence for an arson conviction in Marion County.

On July 16, 2011, was attacked by two offenders around 6:30 a.m. Saturday when the offenders, all housed in the facility's "H" cell house, were being released to the gym for recreation. The offenders stabbed Dewitt several times in an act of gang violence and he was pronounced dead at a local hospital hours later. Dewitt was six months into a 17-year sentence for dealing in a controlled substance and a ten-year sentence for being a felon in possession of a firearm.

Notable Inmates
 John Dillinger, the notorious bank robber and one of the prison's most famous inmates, was sent to the Indiana State Reformatory at Pendleton in the mid-1920s.  In September 1924, Dillinger and a friend robbed a grocery store in Mooresville, Indiana. While the grocer was not seriously hurt, Dillinger did beat him with an iron belt wrapped in cloth. His sentencing of 10–20 years was the maximum sentence one could receive for the crime. While at Pendleton, Dillinger worked in the shirt factory at the facility and often succeeded in doubling his quota. After his wife, Beryl, divorced him and he was denied parole in 1929, Dillinger requested and was granted a transfer to the State Prison at Michigan City, Indiana. After he was finally granted parole in May 1933, he continued his storied escapades around the Mid-West until he was shot and killed on July 22, 1934.
 Richard Hobbs, Coy Hubbard, and John Baniszewski Jr

References

External links

 Official web site

Prisons in Indiana
1923 establishments in Indiana
Buildings and structures in Madison County, Indiana